The Nemiscau River is a river flowing in the municipality of Baie-James, an administrative region of Nord-du-Québec, in Quebec, Canada.

Geography
The Nemiscau River flows into Lake Nemiscau.

In this very complex headwaters, the river passes through numerous lakes and marshes, such as Cramoisy lakes, Teilhard, Biggar and Mountains.

Neighboring hydrographic watersheds are:
 North side: Pontax River, Eastmain River, Eastmain Reservoir;
 South side: Rupert River;
 West side: Lake Nemiscau.

At the end of its course, the river flows in norther edge of Lake Nemiscau, which matches the shape of a U open towards the northeast. The other end of this U receive waters from Rupert River. Lake Nemiscau is north of Lake Giffard and Lake Evans, and south of Jolliet Lake.

Toponymy
In 1672, the explorer Charles Albanel (Catholic priest) had given the name "Nemiskausipiou" to name what is today the Rupert River. During his 1679 trip, Louis Jolliet was also used "Nemisco" to describe the current Rupert River. Handwritten notes indicate Jolliet, "My land was entered by the Saguenay, which comes close to a large lake, named "Timigaming" (the Lake Mistassini), the source River Némiskau (ie Rupert), which discharges into the North Bay (the James Bay), on which I made my way to the sea."

The "Nemiscau" name designating the current river has been in use since the 1940s. Because of upwelling, this river became the Nemiscau Lake, before the waters join the Rupert River. In 1982, the Commission de toponymie du Québec (English: Quebec Names Board) formalized the movement toponymique pointing this river "Rivière Nemiscau".

In 1690, maps refer to the name "Rupert" which refers to the river and the fort. Subsequently, the maps of Claude-Charles Bacqueville de La Potherie use the spelling "R. Rupert" and those of Father Laure in 1731–1732 "R. Rupert." In 1744, Nicolas Bellin also uses graphieu "R. Nemiscau".

Later, the name "Rupert River" prevailed until the 20th century. The place name Nemiscau was recovered, but moving to the northeast to identify the branch of the river remained unnamed until the 1940s.

Cree language, the term "Nemiscau" means "where fish are abundant". "François R." on the map entitled "Party of New France" by Alexis Jaillot, Paris, 1685. "Miskoutenagachit" is on the "Map of Canada or New France and discoveries that were there made" by Guillaume Delisle, Paris 1703. The map "A New and Exact Map of the Dominions of the King of great Britain on ye continent of North America" ([London], 1715, revised in 1732 or after) shows "Miskautenagachit R".

The place name Nemiscau River was formalized on Dec. 2, 1982, to the Bank of place names in Commission de toponymie du Québec (Quebec Names Board).

See also
 Baie-James, a municipality
 Rupert River, a watercourse
 Eastmain River, a watercourse
 Lake Nemiscau, a body of water
 Charles Albanel, French Jesuit priest, missionary and explorer in New France
 Louis Jolliet, a French explorer in New France.
 Jamésie
 Rupert River
 List of rivers of Quebec

References

External links 
 Hydro-Québec: Eastmain-1-A/Sarcelle/Rupert Project
 Commission de toponymie - Québec

Rivers of Nord-du-Québec